Marie-Louise Hairs (1912 – 1998) was a Belgian art historian specializing in Flemish still-life flower paintings of the 17th century.

Her overview of the Flemish flower painters of the 17th century was reprinted and excerpted several times during her lifetime. She is credited with the first academic study of Flemish flower garland painters. She wrote a chapter on flower painting in the 1989 overview of Flemish golden age painting by Edith Greindl.

Works 
 André Daniels : peintre de fleurs Anversois : vers 1600, 1951
 Osias Beert l'Ancien : peintre de fleurs, 1951
 Les peintres Flamands de fleurs au XVIIe siècle, 1955
 Gaspard Thielens, peintre flamand du dix-septième siècle, 1959
 Pour un tricentenaire : Daniel Seghers (1590-1661), 1960
 Les peintres Flamands de fleurs au XVIIe siècle, 1965
 Théodore van Thulden 1606-1669 : oeuvres signées ou attestées sur document, 1965
 Jan Anton van der Baren : monographie, 1970
 XVIIe siècle : l'âge d'or de la peinture flamande, 1989

References 

 Record in RKDartists

People from Liège
Belgian art historians
1912 births
1998 deaths